Marangaluy, also rendered as Marangalu, may refer to:
 Marangaluy-e Bozorg
 Marangaluy-e Kuchek